A crux is a textual passage that is corrupted to the point that it is difficult or impossible to interpret and resolve. Cruxes are studied in palaeography, textual criticism, bibliography, and literary scholarship. A crux is more serious or extensive than a simple slip of the pen or typographical error. The word comes from Latin crux, Latin for "cross", used metaphorically as a difficulty that torments one. Cruxes occur in a wide range of pre-modern (ancient, medieval, and Renaissance) texts, printed and manuscript.

Shakespearean examples
Though widely exposed to readers and scholars, the texts of William Shakespeare's plays yield some of the most famous literary cruxes. Some have been resolved fairly well. In Henry V, II.iii.16-7, the First Folio text has the Hostess describe Falstaff on his death-bed like this:

Lewis Theobald's editorial correction, "and 'a [he] babbl'd of green fields", has won almost universal acceptance from subsequent editors, although an alternative reading, "... as sharp as a pen on a table of green fields", alluding to gaming tables and accountants' tables, has been proposed. Similarly, the "dram of eale" In Hamlet I, iv, 36 can be sensibly interpreted as "dram of ev'l [evil]", but has also been interpreted as "dram of ale".

Other Shakespearean cruxes have not been so successfully resolved. In All's Well That Ends Well, IV.ii, 38-9, Diana observes to Bertram,

Editors have reached no consensus on exactly what "ropes in such a scarre" can mean, or how it should be amended: "no satisfactory explanation or emendation has been offered." Perhaps the best alternative that has been proposed is "may rope 's [us] in such a snare." Another unresolved Shakespearean crux is the "runaway's eyes" in Romeo and Juliet, III, ii, 6.

Sometimes a crux will not require emendation, but simply present a knotty problem of comprehension. In Henry IV, Part 1, IV, i, 98-9, Sir Richard Vernon describes Prince Hal and his comrades as appearing:

This is most likely a reference to some obscure assertion about animal behaviour, and has sent researchers poring through dusty volumes in search of an explanation.

Typographic conventions
In editions of Greek and Roman authors, a crux is marked off by obeli, to indicate that the editor is not confident enough either to follow the manuscript reading or to print a conjecture.

Notes

References
Evans, G. Blakemore, textual editor. The Riverside Shakespeare. Boston, Houghton Mifflin, 1974.
Harlow, C. G. "Shakespeare, Nashe, and the Ostridge Crux in 1 Henry IV." Shakespeare Quarterly Vol. 17, No. 2 (Spring 1966), pp. 171–4.
Newcomer, Alphonso Gerald. "A Shakespeare Crux." Modern Philology, Vol. 11, No. 1 (July 1913), pp. 141–4.

Palaeography
Bibliography